Jarma may refer to:
 Jarma (Libya), the capital of the ancient Garamantian Kingdom
 Jarma (Aksum), a capital of the ancient Kingdom of Aksum
 Jarma (beverage), a beverage of Kyrgyzstan
 Jarma District, a district in Kazakhstan
 Jarma, Pakistan, a place in Pakistan
 Jarma, Jharkhand, a village in Dhanbad district, Jharkhand, India
 Jarma, West Bengal, a village in Midnapore district, West Bengal, India
 Asheik Jarma, Nigerian politician

See also 
 Jerma (disambiguation)
 Germa (disambiguation)
 Djerma (disambiguation)